Prunus clementis is a species of plant in the family Rosaceae. It is found in Sulawesi and the Philippines.

References

Sources

clementis
Flora of Sulawesi
Flora of the Philippines
Near threatened flora of Asia
Taxonomy articles created by Polbot